Rene Bruecker (born 9 December 1966) is a German male canoeist who won four medals at senior level at the Wildwater Canoeing World Championships.

He won a silver at the world championships in 2019 at the age of 52.

Medals at the World Championships
Senior

References

External links
 Rene Bruecker at ICF 

1966 births
Living people
German male canoeists
Place of birth missing (living people)